Saharsa is a city and Municipal corporation in the Saharsa District in the eastern part of the state of Bihar, India. It is situated near the eastern banks of the Kosi River. It serves as the administrative headquarters for Saharsa District and is also the Divisional Headquarter of the Kosi Division.

The name Saharsa originates from the Sanskrit word Saharsha meaning 'laden with joy'. The city has a significant number of Maithili speakers. Alongside Maithili, Hindi is widely understood and spoken.

History
Saharsa is part of the Mithila region, which first gained prominence after settlement by Indo-Aryan tribes that established the Mithila Kingdom (also known as the Kingdom of the Videhas). During the late Vedic period (c. 1100–500 BCE), Videhas developed as one of the major political and cultural centres of South Asia, along with Kuru and Pañcāla. The kings of the Videhas Kingdom were referred to as Janakas.

The Videha Kingdom was later incorporated into the Vajjika League, which had its capital in the city Vaishali, which is also located in Mithila.

Economy

Agriculture

It is a major producer of best quality of Corn and Makhana in India. From Saharsa corn and Makhana are exported abroad countries like America, Australia, France, Japan, England. Every year 2 lakhs tonnes of corn are exported to different countries and similarly Makhana also. The following crops are grown in the region; Makhana , rice, mangoes, litchi, bamboo, mustard, corn, wheat and sugarcane. Apple Ber, Sagwan or Teak Tectona Grandis trees are now grown on a large scale.

Air Transport
Darbhanga Airport is the nearest operational airport roughly 97 km away via road. Spicejet and Indigo currently have many flights from Darbhanga to different metropolitan cities like Bangalore, Mumbai, Delhi, Kolkata, Hyderabad, Ahmedabad.
Rajbiraj Airport is the nearest operational airport roughly 102 km away and can be easily accessed via Kunauli border cross. Shree Airlines operates daily flights between Rajbiraj and Kathmandu.

Geography 
It has an average elevation of 41 metres (134 feet). Saharsa and its surrounding areas occupy a flat alluvial plain forming part of the Kosi river basin. The city lies in the Kosi alluvial megafan, one of the largest alluvial fans in the world. The land is very fertile but frequent changes in the course of the Kosi, one of the largest tributaries of the Ganges, have led to the problems associated with soil erosion. Flooding is a major reason for the poor connectivity of the area; bridges are often washed away. Major flooding occurs almost annually, causing a significant loss of life and property.

Rivers

The Koshi River and its tributaries flood annually, affecting about 21,000 km2 (8,100 sq mi) of fertile agricultural lands and affecting the rural economy. This is the most devastating river of Bihar, earning it the epithet "Sorrow of Bihar".

The Bagmati River regularly breaches its embankments and frequently changes its meandering courses. The annual rate of deposition of alluvium is very high.. The Gandak River also flows through the southern part of Saharsa.

Demographics

In 2011, Saharsa had population of 1,897,102, of which male and female were 995,502 and 901,600 respectively. There was change of 25.79 percent in the population compared to population as per 2001. In the previous census of India 2001, Saharsa District recorded increase of 33.03 percent to its population compared to 1991.

The initial provisional data suggest a density of 1,125 in 2011 compared to 895 of 2001.

Average literacy rate of Saharsa in 2011 were 54.57 compared to 39.08 of 2001. Male and female literacy were 65.22 and 42.73 respectively. For 2001 census, the same figures stood at 51.66 and 25.27 in Saharsa District. Total literate in Saharsa District were 829,206 of which male and female were 521,560 and 307,646 respectively. In 2001, Saharsa District had 465,577 in its total region.

The sex ratio in Saharsa stood at 906 female per 1000 male compared to 2001 census figure of 910. The average national sex ratio in India is 940 as per latest reports of Census 2011 Directorate.

Communication links

 is a railway station under the East Central Railway. It is an A category railway station under Samastipur railway division. This railway junction has been certified as ISO:14001:2015 for environmental management. Saharsa Junction is one of the top 50 rail ticket booking station in India and top 3 rail ticket booking station in ECR. In early 2005, a much-awaited broad gauge line connected it to Khagaria on the New Delhi-Guwahati main line. Earlier there was only a metre gauge line on the Khagaria – Mansi – Forbesganj section of the East Central Railway.

Saharsa is well connected to the other parts of Bihar. Center government of India has selected Saharsa as the Highway hub of the state. Recently Central Government has approved 4 National Highway of four lanes and 1 six lane Expressway

Saharsa - Purnia 4 lane Highway (NH107)

Saharsa - Supaul 4 lane Highway (NH327E)

Saharsa - Madhubani 4 lane Highway (NH527E)

Gorakhpur - Siliguri 6 lane Expressway

NH527E is having the longest River bridge of India. The Length bridge is 10 km. This Highway is also connects Saharsa to Paradip sea Port via Darbhanga, Samastipur, Barh, Hazaribagh, Keonjhar to Paradip sea port.

Saharsa does not have an air transport service, though there is an airstrip reserved for government use. Darbhanga Airport is the nearest domestic airport roughly 88 km away by road. The city is also served by India Post. Its Postal Code is: 852201.

Educational Institutes 

 Abhyuday International School 
 Snehi Sangeetalaya
 ANSS High school saharsa (jail colony)

 Lord Buddha Koshi Medical College and Hospital
 Benevolent Global Public School
 Buddha Public School
 Creative Mind Residential School
 CTE Saharsa
 Darjeeling Public School
 DAV Central School, Saharsa
 Delhi Public School 
 Doon Public School *
 East N West Teachers Training College
 Eklavya Central School
 Evening college
 Global English Medium School
 Green Field School
 Indian High School saharsa
 ITI Saharsa
 Jawahar Navodaya Vidyalaya - JNV Saharsa
 Jay Pratap Singh Public School
 Kendriya Vidiyalaya Saharsa
 Kid Care School, Saharsa Bihar
 Manohar High School
 Master Mind Public School* Govt. Girls High School
 Middle School Sulindabad
 मिलेनियम किड्स अकादमी स्कूल - शिवपुरी,  सहरसा. 
 MLT College Saharsa
 Mukami Mission Academy
 R.M.M. Law College
 Rachana Public School
 Rajendra Mishra College 
 S M Carmel School
 Sarvodaya Public School
 Shanti Mission Academy
 Shanti Niketan Shikshan Sansthan
 S.R.M School
 SNSRKS College
 St Paul's School
 St. Micheal Academy
 St.Xavier
 Tagore Residential School
 Tuition Bureau
 Vairagya International Public School
 Vimal Bharti School 
 Zila Girls High School
 Green Crescent Children's Academy
 +2 Islamia High School
 Zila Boys School Saharsa
 Excellence Residential Academy
 Mandan Bharti Agriculture College, Agwanpur Saharsa

Gallery

Notable people                     
Bindheshwari Prasad Mandal, former Chief Minister of Bihar
Tarkishore Prasad, Deputy Chief Minister of Bihar
R. K. Singh, Union Energy Minister of India
Baldev Mishra writer
Jamshedpur Gopeshwar, politician
Ulka Gupta, actress
Mehboob Ali Kaiser, politician
Rajkamal Choudhary writer
Girija Prasad Koirala, former prime minister of Nepal

See also 
 List of cities in Bihar
Majhaul
Nauhatta
Shankarpur
Chainpur

References

 
Populated places in Mithila, India
Cities and towns in Saharsa district